Võ Thị Ánh Xuân (born 8 January 1970) is a Vietnamese politician and former educator who currently serves as the Vice President of Vietnam since 2021. She was the Acting President of Vietnam in early 2023. 

She was elected Vice President of Vietnam on 6 April 2021 after winning 93.13% of the votes in the National Assembly, continuing the recent norm of having a woman holding this position. Prior to her election, Xuân served as the Secretary of the Party Committee (de facto Governor) of An Giang province and chaired the province's deputies delegation to the National Assembly. A member of the Party Central Committee, she is the second female president after Đặng Thị Ngọc Thịnh, who was also Acting President in 2018. Xuân is the youngest Vice President of Vietnam since 1945.

Early life
Võ Thị Ánh Xuân was born on 8 January 1970 in Thới Sơn, Tịnh Biên, An Giang province. She was a teacher in a high school in Long Xuyên, An Giang Province from 1992 to 1996. She was accepted in the Communist Party of Vietnam on 20 December 1994, officially becoming a member of the party on 20 December 1995.

Political career
From August 1996 to July 2001, Võ Thị Ánh Xuân was a General Research Staff in Office of An Giang Provincial Party Committee. Between 2001 and 2010, she was a member of Standing Board, Vice Chairwoman then Chairwoman of An Giang Women's Union. During that time, she was also a member of the Committee of the An Giang Provincial Party Organisation (December 2005 to October 2010). From August 2010 to October 2010, she was also Deputy Head of An Giang Provincial Commission for Mass Mobilisation.

From November 2010 to January 2013, she was member of Standing Board of An Giang Provincial Party Committee, Secretary of Tan Chau Town Party Committee, An Giang Province. In January 2011, she became an alternate member of the Party Central Committee for the 11th tenure. From February 2013 to November 2013, she was a member of An Giang Provincial Party Committee's Standing Board and the Vice Chairwoman of An Giang People's Committee. From December 2013 to October 2015, she was the vice Secretary of An Giang Provincial Party Committee. On 2 October 2015, she became the Secretary of the An Giang Provincial Party Committee, and still held that position until now.

In January 2016, she was elected a member of the 12th Party Central Committee. After the XIV National Assembly election, she is also the head of the An Giang National Assembly delegation.

On 6 April 2021, the National Assembly of Vietnam adopted a resolution to elect Vo Thi Anh Xuan as Vice President of the Socialist Republic of Vietnam, with the support of 447 out of the 449 deputies present at the sitting, equivalent to 93.13% of the total number of parliamentarians. She is the youngest Vice President of Vietnam since 1945.

On 18 January 2023, she became the interim President of Vietnam after the resignation of Nguyễn Xuân Phúc. She was formally sworn in on 4 February 2023.

Notes

References 

|-

1970 births
Living people
Women vice presidents
People from An Giang Province
Alternates of the 11th Central Committee of the Communist Party of Vietnam
Members of the 12th Central Committee of the Communist Party of Vietnam
Members of the 13th Central Committee of the Communist Party of Vietnam
Vice presidents of Vietnam
Presidents of Vietnam
Female heads of state
Women presidents
21st-century Vietnamese women politicians
21st-century Vietnamese politicians